Energy saving lamps are sources of artificial light that employ advanced technology to reduce the amount of electricity used to generate light, relative to traditional filament-burning light bulbs.

Examples of energy saving lamps include:

 Fluorescent lamps; i.e. regular and compact
 a Light-emitting diode bulb 
 a Light-emitting Electrochemical Cell 
 Magnetic induction lamps

Energy-saving lighting